The Sage is a forthcoming indoor arena and conference centre in Gateshead, United Kingdom due to open in 2025. The site is located between the existing Sage Gateshead venue and the Baltic Centre for Contemporary Art on Gateshead Quayside.

The arena is being built to replace the nearby 11,000 capacity Utilita Arena Newcastle that was originally opened in 1995.

Name and history 
The venue is named for The Sage Group, a British multinational enterprise software company based in Newcastle upon Tyne, who agreed a £10 million deal for the naming rights. As of 2022 the Sage Group are currently patrons of the next-door Sage Gateshead venue which announced that they will be finding a new name for the 2004 building.

Gateshead Council announced plans to redevelop the vacant site in 2014 and at that time the aim was for a mixed use development. The development is likely to cost in excess of £350 million. Preparatory works on the site began in late 2021. £20 million was secured from the UK Government's Levelling Up Fund in 2023.

HOK are the architects of the complex and it is a joint venture between developer Ask Real Estate and investment manager Patrizia AG. The  complex will be operated by ASM Global who currently operate the nearby Utilita Arena Newcastle.

Facilities 
The site will have two hotels run by the Accor group, an ibis and Novotel, with a total of over 300 rooms.

The Sage Arena will have a capacity of 12,500 and will also have outdoor performance spaces, bars, restaurants and retail outlets.

References

External links 
 

Indoor arenas in England
Music venues in Tyne and Wear
Buildings and structures in Gateshead
Exhibition and conference centres in England
Culture in Tyne and Wear
Concert halls in England
Sage Group
Proposed indoor arenas